Sibuco, officially the Municipality of Sibuco,  (Subanen: Benwa Sibuco; Zamboangueño: Municipalidad de Sibuco), is a 1st class municipality in the province of Zamboanga del Norte, Philippines. According to the 2020 census, it has a population of 36,049 people.

It is also treated like a suburb of neighboring Zamboanga City.

Geography

Barangays
Sibuco is politically subdivided into 29 barangays.

Climate

Demographics

Economy

References

External links
 Sibuco Profile at PhilAtlas.com
 [ Philippine Standard Geographic Code]
Philippine Census Information

Municipalities of Zamboanga del Norte